Gabriela "Gaby" Lourdes Pérez del Solar Cuculiza (born July 10, 1968) is a retired Peruvian volleyball player and a politician and former Congresswoman of the Christian People's Party.

Sports career
Perez del Solar began to play volleyball at 14 years old. Her 1.94 m height helped her to become an internationally respected blocker. She ranked in fourth place in the 1984 Summer Olympics. She began to show her abilities for the sport in the 1985 FIVB Volleyball Women's World Cup in Japan, and at just 17 years old was chosen as the best blocker of the tournament and ranked in fifth place, she also won the gold medal in the 1985 South American Championship. She won the 1986 FIVB World Championship bronze medal and silver in the 1987 Pan American Games. She won the gold medal in the 1987 South American Championship and 1987 Japan Cup, where she was awarded Best Spiker. She was a member of the team that won the silver medal in the 1988 Summer Olympics being awarded best receiver.

Pérez won the 1988 Top Four bronze medal, 1989 South American Championship gold medal and ranked in fifth place in the 1989 FIVB World Cup. She ranked sixth in the 1990 FIVB World Championship and won the bronze medal in the 1991 Pan American Games, silver in the 1991 South American Championship and fifth place in the 1991 FIVB Volleyball Women's World Cup. She retired from the Peruvian national team after winning the 1993 South American Championship in Cuzco.

In Italy
After retiring in Peru, Pérez del Solar began playing in Italy. She was invited to become a member of the Italian national team but rejected the offer.

Political life
In 2005, the then-presidential candidate Lourdes Flores Nano invited Perez del Solar to run for Congress and she accepted. In the general elections of 2006, she was elected with the most votes in her district and fifth highest number of votes in the nation. In April 2006, she became a member of the National Unity, in a ceremony prepared by Xavier Barrón and Lourdes Flores. In the 2011 election, she was re-elected for another five-year term on the ticket of the Alliance for the Great Change to which the Christian People's Party now belongs.

Awards

Individuals
 1985 World Cup "Best Blocker"
 1986 World Championship "Best Blocker"
 1988 Olympics "Best Receiver"
 1991 World Cup "Best Blocker"
 1993 South American Championship "Best Blocker"

Clubs
3 Italian Cups (1990, 1991, 1993)

References

External links
 
 
 

1968 births
Living people
Volleyball players at the 1984 Summer Olympics
Volleyball players at the 1988 Summer Olympics
Olympic volleyball players of Peru
Olympic silver medalists for Peru
People from Lima
Peruvian people of Spanish descent
Peruvian people of Italian descent
Christian People's Party (Peru) politicians
Women members of the Congress of the Republic of Peru
Peruvian sportsperson-politicians
Peruvian women's volleyball players
Olympic medalists in volleyball
Medalists at the 1988 Summer Olympics
21st-century Peruvian women politicians
21st-century Peruvian politicians
Pan American Games medalists in volleyball
Pan American Games silver medalists for Peru
Pan American Games bronze medalists for Peru
Volleyball players at the 1987 Pan American Games
Volleyball players at the 1991 Pan American Games
Medalists at the 1987 Pan American Games
Medalists at the 1991 Pan American Games